Michelle Jubelirer (born February 18, 1974 in Altoona, Pennsylvania) is an American music executive who is the current Chair & CEO of Capitol Music Group, a position she was named to in 2021 by Universal Music Group Chairman & CEO Lucian Grainge. She is responsible for the overall management and creative direction of the company, which encompasses Capitol Records, Blue Note Records, Motown Records, Astralwerks, Capitol Christian Music Group, Priority Records and Harvest Records, and is charged with pursuing and nurturing partnerships with artist and executive entrepreneurs to broaden and strengthen CMG’s connections within the creative community.

Early career
Jubelirer began her professional career in 1999 as a mergers and acquisitions attorney at the New York law firm Simpson, Thacher & Barlett.  She joined Sony Music as an in-house attorney in 2003, before relocating to Los Angeles to join entertainment law firm King, Holmes, Paterno & Berliner.

During her eight years at King, Holmes, Paterno & Berliner - five of those as a partner - Jubelirer represented clients including Pharrell, Frank Ocean, M.I.A., Odd Future, Ke$ha, The Gossip, Swedish House Mafia, Avicii, Marilyn Manson, Yeah Yeah Yeahs and Damian Marley.

Capitol Music Group

In January, 2013, Jubelirer was hired by Steve Barnett and Universal Music Group Chairman & CEO Lucian Grainge to help set the creative direction of the new Capitol Music Group.  In 2014 the company ranked #2 in Industry Market Share plus TEA for the 2014 calendar (7.91%), as tracked by Nielsen SoundScan. In 2012, Nielsen Soundscan had ranked CMG at #5 with 6.61%, and the company's move to #2 represented a growth in market share of 20%.

References

External links 
 Capitol Records

Living people
American music industry executives
Universal Music Group
1974 births